Eem is a Thai barbecue restaurant and cocktail bar in Portland, Oregon, United States. In 2019, The Oregonian and Portland Monthly named Eem the city's restaurant of the year. The restaurant used dining pods during the COVID-19 pandemic.

See also
 List of Thai restaurants

References

External links

 
 

Boise, Portland, Oregon
Drinking establishments in Oregon
Thai restaurants in Portland, Oregon